Loughmoe may refer to 
 Loughmore, statutory spelling Loughmoe, village in County Tipperary, Ireland
 Loughmoe Castle, beside the village
 Baron of Loughmoe, feudal title of the castle owner
 Loughmoe West, civil parish containing the village
 Loughmoe East, civil parish across the River Suir from Loughmoe West